A magnetic alloy is a combination of various metals from the periodic table such as ferrite that contains at least one of the three main magnetic elements: iron (Fe), nickel (Ni), or  cobalt (Co) etc.. Such an alloy must contain but is not limited to one or more of these metals. Magnetic alloys have become common, especially in the form of steel (iron and carbon), alnico (iron, nickel, cobalt, and aluminum), and permalloy (iron and nickel). So-called "neodymium magnets" are actually alloys of neodymium, iron and boron forming the crystal structure Nd2Fe14B . The strongest magnetic element is iron, which allows items made out of these alloys to attract to magnets.

See also
 Ferroalloy

References

External links
 Magnetic Alloys. Cobalt Institute. 2017.

Magnetic alloys